Iosif Ivanovich Kuzmin (in Astrakhan – 12 January 1996, in Moscow) was a Soviet-Russian statesman who was First Deputy of the Council of Ministers of the Soviet Union from 1957 to 1958 and Chairman of the State Planning Committee from 1957 to 1959.

Kuzmin was awarded the Order of Lenin, Order of the Patriotic War, 1st class, Order of the Red Star and the Order of the Badge of Honour.

References 

1910 births
1996 deaths
People from Astrakhan
People from Astrakhan Governorate
Central Committee of the Communist Party of the Soviet Union members
Russian communists
Recipients of the Order of Lenin
Burials in Troyekurovskoye Cemetery